The A-Bones was an American garage rock band from Brooklyn, New York. Their name was derived from a song by The Trashmen. The band was formed in 1984 by vocalist Billy Miller and his wife, drummer and co-vocalist Miriam Linna, in the wake of a prior band collaboration, The Zantees. The couple were at the time editors of the rock and roll culture fanzine Kicks and on the threshold of launching Norton Records. Guitarist Bruce Bennett replaced original guitarist Mike Mariconda shortly after the band was formed. Marcus "The Carcass" Natale replaced founding bass player Mike Lewis (a one time member of both the Lyres and Yo La Tengo), prior to recording the A-Bones second E.P. Free Beer For Life in 1988. Tenor sax player Lars Espensen further filled out the group from 1990 until 2010.

The New York Times described the band solely in terms of its label, calling the group "dedicated rock revivalists", and noting "The A-Bones include Miriam Linna and Billy Miller, proprietors of Norton Records, which worships rockabilly, 1960s garage and anything having to do with that most cartoonish rock archetype: the juvenile delinquent in a leather jacket." In its overview of the band the Trouser Press' online music guide praised the A-Bones' "new levels of sloppy enthusiasm" and stated that the band's "joyously cruddy sound is built on Linna's simple but effective pounding, Miller's manly grunt, and Bruce Bennett's unexpectedly inventive guitar work."  The Village Voice declared that a 2009 A-Bones recording "may be the missing link between Andre Williams and Jay Reatard, if Jay had any groove in his grit."  According to a series of postings on the WFMU Ichiban blog and WFMU's own Beware of The Blog blogsite, the band's choice of cover material has ranged from songs by no-hit obscurities like Mike Waggoner and the Bops, to covers of The Troggs, Larry Williams, The Velvet Underground, The Rolling Stones, the MC5 and many others.

From Brooklyn to Japan
Aside from recording five albums, two EPs and roughly a dozen 45s on various labels, the A-Bones also served as a backup band for acts such as Hasil Adkins, Ronnie Dawson, Cordell Jackson, Andre Williams, Ray Sharpe, The Flamin' Groovies' Roy Loney and Cyril Jordan and many others. Though the band broke up in 1994,
the A-Bones reunited in 2004 and performed gigs in North America, Europe, and Japan with their core line-up of Linna, Miller, Bennett and Natale. The group was occasionally augmented live by Yo La Tengo's Ira Kaplan, who contributed keyboards and guitar to 2009's Not Now!, 2014's Ears Wide Shut, and other recent recordings. Miller died on November 13, 2016.

Discography

EPs
Tempo Tantrum (1986)
Free Beer for Life! (1988)

LPs
The Life of Riley (1991)
I Was a Teenage Mummy (1992)
Music Minus Five (1993)
Crash the Party: The Wild, Wild Sounds of Benny Joy (1996)
Not Now! (2009)
Ears Wide Shut (2014)

Compilation albums
Daddy Wants a Cold Beer and Other Million Sellers (2004)
I Hate CD's: Norton Records 45 RPM Singles Collection, Vol. 1 (2007)
 Daddy Rockin Strong: A Tribute to Nolan Strong & The Diablos (The Wind / Norton Records, 2010, TWR002 LP) tracks: Real True Love and The Way You Dog Me Around (w/Andre Williams)

References

External links
 Levi Fuller review: The Life of Riley (October 29, 2009)
 Blurt Obituary 
 New York Times obituary 
 Brooklyn Vegan Obituary 
 Pitchfork Obituary
 Rolling Stone magazine obituary 

Garage punk groups
Garage rock groups from New York (state)
Musical groups from Brooklyn
Norton Records artists
Rockabilly music groups